Maria Olivera Lazarević (1372 – after 1444), also known as Despina Hatun, was a Serbian princess and consort of the Ottoman sultan. She was the youngest daughter of Lazar of Serbia and Princess Milica. She was the wife of Ottoman Sultan Bayezid I, whom she married just after the Battle of Kosovo in 1389 as a pledge of peace between the Lazarević and Ottoman dynasties.

The story of Olivera's and Bayezid's captivity by Timur after the Battle of Ankara (1402) has been popularly narrated, most often in plays and operas. The most significant one is Tamburlaine (1587–1588) by Christopher Marlowe, in which she is named “Zabina”.

Biography

Olivera was born around 1372, the youngest daughter of Prince Lazar and Princess Milica of Serbia. Her mother was a descendant of Grand Prince (Veliki Župan) Stefan Nemanja, the founder of the Nemanjić dynasty and the fourth cousin once removed of Emperor Dušan of Serbia. Olivera had four older sisters—Mara (mother of Serbian despot Đurađ Branković), Dragana, Teodora, and Jelena (mother of Balša III, the last ruler of Zeta)—and two brothers—Serbian despot Stefan Lazarević and Vuk.

After the Battle of Kosovo in 1389, Olivera was sent to the harem of Sultan Bayezid I where she remained for the next 12 years. They had two daughters: Öruz Hatun and Paşa Melek Hatun. Despite her marriage, she apparently never converted to Islam. She had a considerable influence over the sultan, which helped her people, country, and family survive in turbulent times.

In the Battle of Ankara on 20 July 1402, Olivera and Bayezid were captured by Timur. Olivera was widowed in 1403. A Ragusan chronicler Mavro Orbini wrote in the Kingdom of the Slavs (1601) that she died in captivity two days after Bayezid's death, which turned out to be incorrect. Serbian soldier and memoirist Konstantin Mihailović noted that Timur felt sorry for Bayezid's death and released his delegation, including his wife.

After her release, she spent the rest of her life at the court of her brother Stefan in Belgrade and at the court of her sister Jelena in Herceg Novi. There she became a patron of art and literature. Olivera died sometime after 1444.

In fiction
The story of Olivera's and Bayezid's captivity has been popularly narrated, most often through plays and operas. The most significant one is Tamburlaine (1587–1588) by Christopher Marlowe, English playwright and poet of the Elizabethan era. In the play, she is named ”Zabina”.  According to the story, Timur (Tamerlane) kept Bayezid (Bajazeth) in an iron cage while Zabina was forced to serve as a slave. In the end, they both committed suicide. The same story, which included Olivera, was used in Tamerlan, ou la mort de Bajazet (1676) by Jacques Pradon, Bajazeth und Tamerlan (1690) by Johann Philipp Förtsch, and Timour the Tartar (1811) by Matthew Lewis.

See also
 Mara Branković

References

Sources
 
 
 
 
Princess Olivera, a forgotten Serbian Heroine, Princess Olivera Foundation, Belgrade 2009

External links
Princess Olivera - Foundation Фонд „Принцеза Оливера“
Оливера - принцеза у харему („Вечерње новости“, фељтон 1-10. новембар 2009) - srb

1372 births
1444 deaths
Medieval Serbian princesses
Serbs from the Ottoman Empire
Olivera
15th-century consorts of Ottoman sultans